Zanes may refer to:

 Dan Zanes, member of the popular 1980s band The Del Fuegos
 Warren Zanes, American musician and writer
 Zanes of Olympia, bronze statues of Zeus